In Greek mythology, Meriones  was the Cretan son of Molus and Melphis or Euippe. Molus was a half-brother of Idomeneus. Like other heroes of mythology, Meriones was said to be a descendant of gods. As a grandson of Deucalion (son of Minos), Meriones' ancestors include Zeus, Europa, Helios, and Pasiphae, the sister of Circe. Meriones possessed the helmet of Amyntor, which Autolycus had stolen. He inherited the helmet from his father Molus and later gave it to Odysseus. Meriones killed seven men at Troy.

Description 
Meriones was described by the chronicler Malalas in his account of the Chronography as "shortish, wide, white, good beard, big eyes, black hair, curly hair, flat face, bent nose, quick-moving, magnanimous, a warrior". Meanwhile, in the account of Dares the Phrygian, he was illustrated as ". . . auburn-haired, of moderate height, with a well-proportioned body. He was robust, swift, unmerciful, and easily angered."

Mythology

Prior to The Iliad 
Hyginus lists Meriones as one of the suitors of Helen.  This would have made him oath bound to participate in the Trojan War.  Other ancient authorities, however, do not include him in the list. Among these are the Bibliotheca and Hesiod.

The Iliad 
Though not usually numbered among the major characters, Meriones is one of the most powerful characters in Homer's Iliad. He exemplifies the attributes of a hero without the hubris or pride of one. Meriones is mentioned in Books II, IV, V, VII, VIII, IX, X, XIII, XIV, XV, XVI, XVII.  He is recorded to have killed Phereclus the son of Tecton (Book V), Adamas the son of Asius (Book XIII), Harpalion son of King Pylaemenes (Book XIII), Morys (Book XIV), Hippotion (Book XIV), Acamas (Book XVI), Laogonus son of Onetor (Book XVI),  and wounded Deiphobus son of Priam (Book XIII).

Book II 
The first reference to Meriones in the Iliad is in the Catalog of Ships in Book II.  There he is listed alongside Idomeneus as one of the leaders of the eighty ships from Crete.  He is described here and in Books VIII and XIII as a "peer of murderous Ares".

Book VII 
Meriones is among those who volunteered to fight Hector in single combat.  The others were Agamemnon, Diomedes, Telamonian Ajax, Ajax the Lesser, Idomeneus, Eurypylus (son of Euaemon), Thoas, and Odysseus.  Lots were cast to determine who among these would fight and Telamonian Ajax was chosen.

Books IX and X 
Meriones, along with Nestor's son Thrasymedes, were charged to serve as sentinels for the Achaean army during a period of Trojan advance. Later that night, Nestor called for a volunteer spy among the captains and Diomedes stepped forward. A volunteer was then requested to join Diomedes and Meriones was among the volunteers. The two Ajaxes, Thrasymedes, Menelaus, and Odysseus also volunteered. Diomedes chose Odysseus. As Odysseus was inadequately armed, Meriones acquired a bow and arrows for him and gave him the helm of Amyntor.

Book XIII 
After casting his spear at Deiphobus, but failing to pierce his shield, Meriones returned to his tent to get a new spear. He met Idomeneus there:

Meriones grabbed a bronze spear and followed Idomeneus:

The two then went to reinforce the left flank where they perceived the Achaeans to be weakest, Meriones leading the way. The two battled against the Trojans, particularly Deiphobus and Aeneas. In retaliation for the death of Ascalaphus, Meriones pierced Deiphobus in the shoulder with his spear. Gravely injured, Deiphobus was carried from the battlefield by his brother Polites. Meriones then killed Adamas son of Asius and Harpalion son of King Pylaemenes.

Books XVII and XXIII 

After the death of Patroclus, Menelaus called on Meriones and the two Ajaxes to defend the body while he sought Antilochus to act as a messenger of the news to Achilles. Upon returning, Menelaus and Meriones carried Patroclus's body off the battlefield while the Ajaxes guarded them against further attack.

When the funeral pyre for Patroclus was built, Meriones was given charge over the men sent by Agamemnon to all parts of the camp to get wood. They felled timber and brought it to the place where Achilles would later build the structure.

Meriones competed in chariot racing at the funeral games. At the start he was fourth in line behind Antilochus, Eumelus, and Menelaus. Diomedes was fifth in line. Meriones placed fourth behind Diomedes, Antilochus, and Menelaus. He is described as having the slowest horses and being the worst driver of the lot. His prize was two talents of gold.

Meriones fared considerably better in the archery contest:

Agamemnon and Meriones both stood for the javelin throw competition, but Achilles declared Agamemnon to be the greatest among javelin throwers. He proposed that Agamemnon take the cauldron prize and give Meriones the bronze spear. Agamemnon agreed.

Posthomerica 
Meriones is also a prominent character in Quintus Smyrnaeus' Posthomerica, his epic poem, telling the story of the Trojan War, from the death of Hector to the fall of Troy. In Book 1, Meriones kills the Amazons, Evandre and Thermodosa. In Book 6, with Teucer, Idomeneus, Thoas and Thrasymedes, he comes to the rescue of Agamemnon and Menelaus and kills the Paeonian warrior, Laophoon. in Book 8, Meriones kills Chlemus, the son of Peisenor, and kills Phylodamas with an arrow, and in Book 11 he kills Lycon. In Book 12, Meriones is one of the Greeks to enter Troy inside the Trojan Horse.

In Gluck's opera 

Christoph Willibald Gluck gave Meriones a role in his 1765 opera Telemaco, making this character involved in Odysseus' wanderings after the Trojan War (which is not attested in Homer's original Odyssey on which the opera was based).

Notes

References
Dares Phrygius, from The Trojan War. The Chronicles of Dictys of Crete and Dares the Phrygian translated by Richard McIlwaine Frazer, Jr. (1931-). Indiana University Press. 1966. Online version at theio.com
Homer.  The Iliad (Samuel Butler Translation - 1898), Wikisource.
Homer, The Iliad with an English Translation by A.T. Murray, Ph.D. in two volumes. Cambridge, MA., Harvard University Press; London, William Heinemann, Ltd. 1924. . Online version at the Perseus Digital Library.
Homer, Homeri Opera in five volumes. Oxford, Oxford University Press. 1920. . Greek text available at the Perseus Digital Library.
Quintus Smyrnaeus, The Fall of Troy translated by Way. A. S. Loeb Classical Library Volume 19. London: William Heinemann, 1913. Online version at theio.com
Quintus Smyrnaeus, The Fall of Troy. Arthur S. Way. London: William Heinemann; New York: G.P. Putnam's Sons. 1913. Greek text available at the Perseus Digital Library.
 Quintus Smyrnaeus, The Trojan Epic: Posthomerica, JHU Press, 2007. .

Achaean Leaders
Cretan characters in Greek mythology